Tono No.2 Dam  is a gravity dam located in Iwate Prefecture in Japan. The dam is used for flood control. The catchment area of the dam is 33.5 km2. The dam impounds about 8  ha of land when full and can store 248 thousand cubic meters of water. The construction of the dam was started on 1990 and completed in 2010.

See also
List of dams in Japan

References

Dams in Iwate Prefecture